Doniford Halt railway station, sometimes known as Doniford Beach Halt, is a request stop situated on the  West Somerset Railway, a heritage railway in Somerset, England.  It is situated by Helwell Bay on the outskirts of Watchet.

History 
The railway line was originally opened in 1862 and closed in 1971, but it was reopened by the West Somerset Railway on 28 August 1976.  Doniford Beach Halt was opened on 27 June 1987 to serve the holiday camp built on the site of the nearby former Doniford army base.

Description 
The curved platform is situated on the north side of the line where it passes beneath the Watchet to West Quantoxhead coast road.

Services 

Trains only call by request so passengers waiting to join are asked to make a clear signal to the driver as the train approaches, and people wanting to alight need to inform the train’s guard in good time.

References

External links

 West Somerset Railway - Doniford Halt

West Somerset Railway
Heritage railway stations in Somerset
Railway stations in Great Britain opened in 1987
Railway stations built for UK heritage railways
Railway request stops in Great Britain